Brzeće is a village located in the municipality of Brus, Serbia. As of 2011 census, it has a population of 238 inhabitants.

The Kopaonik ski resort is located in close proximity of the village The village is popular due to its rural hand-made art that can be seen by anyone passing by car on the road (360 panorama).

Demographics
According to the 2011 census, the village has a population of 238 inhabitants, down from 258 inhabitants as of 2002 census.

References

Populated places in Rasina District
Kopaonik